Day Zero (Persian: روز صفر, romanized: rooz-e sefr) is a 2020 Iranian action thriller drama film directed by Saeid Malekan and written by Bahram Tavakoli and Malekan. The film screened for the first time at the 38th Fajr Film Festival and earned 7 nominations and received 5 awards.

Premise 
The story is about the arresting of the famous terrorist Abdolmalek Rigi and how it was accomplished.

Cast 

 Amir Jadidi as Reza / Siavash
 Saed Soheili as Abdolmalek Rigi
 Tinoo Salehi as Farough
 Mohammadreza Maleki as Security Agent
 Amin Golestaneh as Bashir
 Mahdi Gorbani as Suicide Terrorist
 Abolfazl Amiri as Terrorist Sniper
 Reza Khodadbigi as Suicide Terrorist
 Sina Shafiei as Security Agent
 Abolfazl Saffary as Reporter

 Hamidreza Soleymani
 Milad Yazdani
 Mohammad-Ali Rajpout
 Ebrahim Barzideh
 Mojgan Mokhber Sabet
 Navid Karimzadeh
 Ali-Asghar Sabouri Rad
 Mohammad Dagheri
 Mohammadreza Tahiri

Reception

Accolades

References

External links 

 

Iranian war films
2020s Persian-language films
2020 directorial debut films
2020 films